Stretch Point State Park is a public recreation area occupying  of land on the northern tip of Stretch Island in Mason County, Washington. The state park is only accessible by boat and is administered as a satellite of Jarrell Cove State Park.

References

External links
Jarrell Cove State Park Washington State Parks and Recreation Commission

State parks of Washington (state)
Parks in Mason County, Washington
Protected areas established in 1967